Fort Lincoln was one of seven temporary earthwork forts part of the Civil War Defenses of Washington, DC during the Civil War built in the Northeast quadrant of the city at the beginning of the Civil War by the Union Army to protect the city from the Confederate Army. From west to east, the forts were as follow: Fort Slocum, Fort Totten, Fort Slemmer, Fort Bunker Hill, Fort Saratoga, Fort Thayer and Fort Lincoln.

Battery Jamson was a large battery east of the fort overlooking the Anacostia River providing additional support.

Civil War
Fort Lincoln was built starting on August 26, 1861 by the First Regiment Massachusetts Volunteer Infantry along the border of the District of Columbia and Prince George's County, Maryland it was named in honor of President Abraham Lincoln by General Order No. 18, A.G.O., Sept. 30, 1861. It was built on the old Baltimore Pike, 2 and 1/2 miles from the city at the time.

The fort was armed with the following guns:
 Eight 6-pounder field guns (bronze)
 Four 12-pounder field guns
 Five 24-pounder James gun (barbette)
 One 24-pounder James gun
 Six 32-pounder sea-coast howitzers
 Two 24-pounder howitzers
 Two 8-inch howitzers
 Two Coehorn mortars
 One 10-inch mortar M. 1841
 Four 30-pounder Parrotts
 One 100-pounder Parrott

The following troops were garrisoned at Fort Lincoln:
 Old Joe Hooker's brigade composed of the First Regiment Massachusetts Volunteer Infantry, 11th Regiment Massachusetts Volunteer Infantry, 2nd New Hampshire Volunteer Infantry and 26th Pennsylvania Infantry
 3rd Regiment Massachusetts Volunteer Heavy Artillery
 Battery D, 1st Rhode Island Light Artillery
 Company A, Main Coast Guards
 Detachments of the New Hampshire Heavy Artillery
 150th Ohio National Guards

A cavalry outpost was located close by with the 7th Michigan Volunteer Cavalry Regiment composed of about 500 men under the command of Major Darling. During the Battle of Fort Stevens On the afternoon of July 12, 1864, had a brush with the enemy's cavalry beyond Bladensburg, Maryland. Captain T.S. Paddock was in command of the fort at the time.

To the East, was located Battery Jameson. It was established in 1862 as an outer works of the fort on a bluff in Prince George's County, Maryland under the direction of Brigadier General John G. Barnard and named after Major General Charles D. Jameson, who died of typhoid fever on November 6, 1862. It was at the end of the line and overlooked he Eastern Branch of the Potomac River (now the Anacostia River with several other smaller unnamed batteries around.

Post-Civil War
Today, the majority of the remaining fort is within Fort Lincoln Cemetery in Prince George's County, Maryland and can be visited. A marker has been placed to commemorate the fort.

See also

 Civil War Defenses of Washington
 Washington, D.C., in the American Civil War
 Abraham Lincoln
 Fort Slocum
 Fort Totten
 Fort Slemmer
 Fort Bunker Hill
 Fort Saratoga
 Fort Thayer
 Battle of Fort Stevens

References

Civil War defenses of Washington, D.C.
Parks in Washington, D.C.
Forts on the National Register of Historic Places in Washington, D.C.
American Civil War on the National Register of Historic Places
Northeast (Washington, D.C.)